Mercedes is a city in the center of the . It is 275 km from the provincial capital, Corrientes, and 739 km from Buenos Aires.

The town, founded in 1829, is served by several grade schools, including Escuela Normal Manuel Florencio Mantilla, Colegio San Carlos, Escuela Agrotécnica Eulogio Cruz Cabral, Escuela Comercial Nocturna Ejército Argentino, and Instituto Popular de Mercedes Manuel López Rodríguez.

Mercedes is in the middle of an important livestock-raising area and hosts large livestock exhibitions and fairs. It has a Historical and Fine Arts Museum, as well as a Natural History Museum with more than 1,000 animal samples. There is a sanctuary in memory of the Gauchito Gil, a popular religious and folkloric figure, 10 km from the city.

Climate

Sports
The city is home to the professional basketball team Club Comunicaciones (Mercedes), which plays its home games at the Estadio Cubierto Club Comunicaciones.

References
In Spanish.

 
 Portal of Mercedes - Official website.
 Portal of Argentina - Argentine portal.
  - School portal.

Populated places in Corrientes Province